The Moral Economy of the Peasant: Rebellion and Subsistence in Southeast Asia is a 1976 book by James C. Scott on the nature of subsistence ethics in peasant cultures. He asserts that peasants prefer the stability of state or landlord protection of minimal subsistence over the risky instability of self-subsistence, producing a feudal moral economy. Where colonialism and introductions of market economies interfere with this arrangement, peasants will rebel, separate from concerns about fluctuating quality of life. Scott cites three 1930s rebellions as examples: Cochinchina, the Burmese Saya San Rebellion, and the Vietnamese Nghệ-Tĩnh Soviets.

Bibliography

External links 

 

1976 non-fiction books
English-language books
Books about Asia
American non-fiction books
Books by James C. Scott
Yale University Press books